Prokopyevskaya is a rural locality (a village) in Tarnogskoye Rural Settlement, Tarnogsky District, Vologda Oblast, Russia. The population was 11 as of 2002.

Geography 
Prokopyevskaya is located 12 km south of Tarnogsky Gorodok (the district's administrative centre) by road. Kuznetsovskaya is the nearest rural locality.

References 

Rural localities in Tarnogsky District